Ryler DeHeart and Pierre-Ludovic Duclos were the defending champions, but chose not to play this year.

Brian Dabul and Izak van der Merwe won the final 6–1, 6–7(7–2), [11–9], against John Paul Fruttero and Raven Klaasen.

Seeds

Draw

Draw

References
 Main Draw

Manta Open - Doubles
Manta Open